Chulakivka is a village (selo) in Skadovsk Raion, Kherson Oblast, southern Ukraine. The village hosts the administration of Chulakivka rural hromada, one of the hromadas of Ukraine. It had a population of 3,087. Its local government is the Chulakivka village council.

Administrative status 
Until 18 July, 2020, Chulakivka belonged to Hola Prystan Raion. The raion was abolished in July 2020 as part of the administrative reform of Ukraine, which reduced the number of raions of Kherson Oblast to five. The area of Hola Prystan Raion was merged into Skadovsk Raion.

History 

Chulakivka was founded in 1751.

2022 Russian occupation 

On 14 March, 2022, Chulakivka was captured and occupied by the Russian Armed Forces during the 2022 Russian invasion of Ukraine.

On 31 December, Ukraine conducted the Chulakivka military quarters shelling, which the Ukrainians claimed to have killed or wounded 500 Russian soldiers.

Demographics 
According to the 1989 Soviet census, the population of the village was 3,009 people, of whom 1,442 were men and 1,567 women.

According to the 2001 Ukrainian census, 3,051 people lived in the village.

Languages 
According to the 2001 census, the primary languages of the inhabitants of the village were:

Infrastructure 
In the village, the Chulakivka secondary school serves grades one through three.

References 

Villages in Skadovsk Raion